The Pittsburgh Steelers franchise has had 16 head coaches throughout its history. Joe Bach served two separate terms as head coach and Walt Kiesling served three separate terms. During these seasons, Kiesling shared coaching duties with Greasy Neale and Phil Handler, who have not been included within this list.

In , under Sutherland, the Steelers played their first playoff game against the Philadelphia Eagles. Ten of the 16 head coaches spent their entire professional coaching careers with the franchise, including Kiesling, John McNally, and Chuck Noll, who have also been voted into the Pro Football Hall of Fame. Bill Cowher, who was Noll's replacement, coached the Steelers to their fifth Super Bowl victory, in 2005 and was voted into the Hall of Fame in 2020. The Steelers' sixth Super Bowl win came in Super Bowl XLIII, while head-coached by Mike Tomlin, the team's current head coach. As of 2022, the Steelers have had only three head coaches in the last 54 years.

List of head coaches

Coaches
Note: Statistics are accurate through the end of the 2022 NFL season.

Footnotes

 Bach's full coaching record with the Steelers is 48 regular season games coached with a record of 21–27 and a W–L percentage of .438.
 Kiesling's full coaching record with the Steelers is 90 regular season games coached with a record of 30–55–5 and a W–L percentage of .353.
  In  the Steelers combined with the Philadelphia Eagles to form the "Steagles", and Walt Kiesling shared the head coach position with Greasy Neale. In  the Steelers combined with the Chicago Cardinals to form "Card-Pitt", and Walt Kiesling shared the head coaching position with Phil Handler.

See also
List of Pittsburgh Steelers players

References

External links
Pittsburgh Steelers history at CBS

Pittsburgh Steelers
 
coaches